The Rupandehi Challengers (often abbreviated as RC) are a franchise cricket team representing the city of Rupandehi in the Dhangadhi Premier League (DPL). Founded in 2017 one of the six founding teams of the DPL, the Rupandehi franchise is owned by Suraj Upreti. Shakti Gauchan is the captain and the strategic player of the team.

Franchise history 
The Dhangadhi Premier League began its tournament in 2018 with 6 teams from representing different cities and districts of Nepal. Rupandehi Challengers was part of the founding team to participate in the DPL 2017.

2017 DPL season 
Rupandehi Challengers finished 3rd in the tournament despite topping the preliminary group stage and qualifying to the playoffs. RC lost both of its playoff match and thus missed an opportunity to qualify for the finals.

2018 DPL season 
Rupandehi Challengers did not win the single game and finished the tournament in the last position.

Current players 
This is the list of players who are currently in the squad of Rupandehi Challengers.

All-time players 

Bold names of the players represents that the player is in the latest year squad of the team.

Source: Cricinfo

Seasons

Statistics

Win–loss record 

Last updated: 2018 DPL

Head to head in DPL 

*Bold team represents that the team has been defunct.

Last updated: 8-Mar-2018

See also 
 Dhangadhi Premier League
 Nepal national cricket team

References 

Cricket teams in Nepal
Cricket clubs established in 2017
Rupandehi District
2017 establishments in Nepal